A donor is an individual or organization that donates something.

Donor may also refer to:

 Donor (fairy tale), a literary stock character
 Donor (horse) (foaled 1944), an American Thoroughbred racehorse
 Donor (semiconductors), a dopant atom in semiconductor design
 "Donor" (The Outer Limits), a television episode

See also
 Donar (disambiguation)
 Doner (disambiguation)